Friedrich Turek (born 24 July 1940) is an Austrian ice hockey player. He competed in the men's tournament at the 1964 Winter Olympics.

References

External links

1940 births
Living people
Ice hockey people from Vienna
Ice hockey players at the 1964 Winter Olympics
Olympic ice hockey players of Austria